
The yeren were peasants and commoners under the ancient Zhou dynasty China .  Living mostly in underdeveloped rural areas, they were considered uncivil people by the upper class guoren, who regarded themselves as cultured citizens living within the walls of larger urban settlements.

Zilu, one of Confucius's favorite disciples, was considered to be one and the Analects includes a passage giving the yeren primacy over the Zhou in having undergone the influence of "ritual and music".

See also
 Hua–Yi distinction

Notes

References

Citations

Bibliography
 .

Zhou dynasty people